Dev Sanyal (born 4 September 1965) is the Chief Executive Officer of VARO Energy, a diversified energy company headquartered in Zug, Switzerland (since 1 January 2022). Prior to this, Dev had a 32-year global career with BP plc.

Early life and education 
Dev Sanyal was born in New Delhi, India and grew up in Darjeeling according to Bloomberg. His father, K.S.B. Sanyal, was the Chairman of the Andrew Yule Group.

Dev Sanyal studied at St. Paul’s School, Darjeeling and St. Stephen’s College, Delhi. He graduated from The Fletcher School of Law and Diplomacy at Tufts University with a Master’s degree in Politics and Economics. Dev Sanyal is currently a member of the Board of Overseers of the school.

Career 
Dev Sanyal serves as the Chief Executive Officer of VARO Energy Group. Until 31 December 2021, Dev had a 32-year career with BP plc including over a decade on the group executive committee. He headed gas and low carbon energy globally. Prior to this, he was chief executive, alternative energy and also accountable for BP’s Europe and Asia regions. During his tenure, Dev built businesses in sustainable energy – solar, offshore wind, onshore wind, hydrogen and gas, – and led the company’s energy transition.

From 1999 to 2002, Dev was CEO of BP Eastern Mediterranean and from 2003 to 2007, Dev Sanyal served as the CEO of Air BP International. From 2007 to 2011, he was also Group Treasurer and Chair of BP Investment Management. Dev was appointed Executive Vice President in 2011. 

On January 1, 2022, Dev Sanyal was appointed CEO of VARO Energy.  In July 2022, Dev announced the ONE VARO Transformation Strategy focused on conventional and sustainable energies, with a commitment to investing two-thirds of capital in renewable businesses. VARO plans to be net zero by 2040.

Memberships 

 Independent non-executive director on the board of M&G plc.
 Independent non-executive director on the board of Man Group plc from 2013 to 2022. 
 Member of the Accenture Global Energy Board from 2012 to 2018.
 Vice Chairman, Centre for China in the World Economy, Tsinghua University from 2014 to 2019.  
 Member of the Duke of Edinburgh’s International Award Foundation from 2012 to 2015.
 Member of the energy advisory board of the Government of India.
 Member of the advisory board of the Centre for European Reform.
 Fellow of the Energy Institute.
 Trustee of Career Ready from 2007 to 2013.

References 

Living people
1965 births
St. Stephen's College, Delhi alumni
The Fletcher School at Tufts University alumni
People from Darjeeling